The Legend of Tarzan is an American animated television series produced by Walt Disney Television Animation, based on Tarzan from the novels written by Edgar Rice Burroughs, the character's original creator who appears in one episode of the series. The series is also based on the film Tarzan by Walt Disney Pictures and aired initially on the Disney's One Too block on UPN. However, reruns were broadcast shortly after on Disney Channel.

The series picks up where the 1999 feature film left off, with the title character adjusting to his new role as leader of the gorilla family following Kerchak's death, along with Jane (whom he has since married) and her father, Professor Archimedes Q. Porter, adjusting to life in the jungle. The three now reside in the treehouse built by Tarzan's original human parents.

Characters

Main
 Tarzan (voiced by Michael T. Weiss) has assumed his role as leader of the gorillas. He married Jane, and they live in the jungle, residing in the treehouse that Tarzan's parents had built before their deaths. Although Tarzan doesn't live with Kala and the other gorillas, Tarzan will still take action to protect them and often seeks Kala's advice in dealing with situations. While Tarzan helps Jane get over her romantic ideas about jungle life, she acts as his guide to the duplicity of human nature — and insists he eats his food from a plate. It is a never-ending growth process for both, with insights into what "being civilized" means.
 Jane (voiced by Olivia d'Abo) is married to Tarzan. She has adjusted quite well to her new jungle life with Tarzan. When she begins to miss her old life in England, she tries to get Tarzan to act more "civilized," which sometimes poses problems to Tarzan's morals. Her appearance and human actions often cause some members of Tarzan's gorilla tribe to have doubts about her and question Tarzan's leadership.
 Terk (voiced by April Winchell) is a spotlight-loving female gorilla and the perfect "big sister" material because she's Tarzan's closest friend and older adoptive cousin. She is protective, concerned, and convinced that Tarzan can't survive without her despite Tarzan having proven repeatedly to be stronger, faster, and more skillful at just about everything in the jungle than Terk. Even though Terk is very bossy at times, Tarzan knows it's because she cares, though she will never say so willingly.
 Tantor the Elephant (voiced by Jim Cummings) is cowardly – he is afraid of bacteria, pond scum, piranhas (which aren't even in Africa), and randomly anything else. But when it comes to helping Tarzan when he's in trouble, Tantor shows know-it-all Terk a thing or two in the bravery department and leads the way.
 Kala (voiced by Susanne Blakeslee) acts as the voice of the apes, reminding Tarzan of his particular obligations to the family. She is also Jane's closest confidant. The two share a warm, strong bond, and Jane regards her mother-in-law as her only kindred spirit in the jungle. From Kala's point of view, Jane is the human daughter she never had. Her open mind is a well of great wisdom, and she is almost always right. Even though Kerchak is gone, she is still highly respected. Although kind and motherly to Tarzan, Jane, and all the gorillas, Kala is almost undoubtedly the bravest gorilla in the family.
 Professor Porter (voiced by Jeff Bennett) is a noted scientist with years of expertise studying gorillas, though before arriving in Africa in the first film, he had never seen one in the wild. Sometimes the kindhearted professor gets absorbed in his thinking but often forgets what he's doing. When they finally meet the gorillas, it's the fulfillment of a lifelong dream, even if the professor does faint. Jeff Bennett replaces the late Nigel Hawthorne (who died just months after the show's premiere).
 Kerchak (voiced by Lance Henriksen) was the mate of Kala and the adoptive father of Tarzan. Kerchak is mentioned posthumously and appears in several flashbacks in the series. Tarzan made a statue of him to commemorate his adoptive father and predecessor as leader of the gorilla troop. Henriksen is one of only three actors to reprise their roles from the film.

Allies
 Flynt (voiced by Erik von Detten) and Mungo (voiced by Jason Marsden) are clueless ape brothers. Flynt and Mungo have grown up along Tarzan, but they're still as dopey as ever. Most likely due to results of self-inflicted head trauma from playing their childhood game "stop hitting yourself." While the brothers mean no harm, their dumb behavior may cause conflict for Tarzan. Since they spend all their time together, being separated will cause them to freak out. They are two of only three characters to retain their voice actors from the film (the third being Lance Henriksen as Kerchak).
 Booto is the leader of a rhinoceros herd.
 Manu (voiced by Frank Welker) is a mischievous baby baboon who is fascinated with humans. He often rummages through their belongings by trying on their clothes. He may even run off with a shiny keepsake or two. Like any curious child, he leaves a mess behind, much to frustration Tarzan and other family matters. His mischief, however, sometimes ends up doing more good than first assumed.
 Renard Dumont (voiced by René Auberjonois) is a slick, opportunistic French proprietor of "Dumont's Trading Post" (est. 1912), whose lust for material gain is compromised only by his persistent attempts to lure Jane from her life with Tarzan. Though somewhat of a nemesis in his first appearance, he later becomes a reluctant ally of Tarzan. A good example is when he disguises himself as a high-ranking official to secure the release of Tarzan, Hugo, and Hooft. He even allows Tarzan and his friends to borrow one of his boats to find out the source of the poison that has flown into the river and endangered the jungle (knowing that the contaminated water would ruin his business). 
 Hugo (voiced by Dave Thomas) and Hooft (voiced by Joe Flaherty) – As deserters of the French Foreign Legion, these Americans now work for Dumont but still have the occasional run-in with Lt. Colonel Staquait (their former superior), who considers their insubordination (refusal to raze a village of women and children) a capital offense. They also seem to owe money to "Joey the Shark," a loan shark in Chicago (which is likely why they joined the Legion in the first place). Although they are smooth-talking conmen who try to cheat people out of money, they are good-natured and willing to do anything for their friends.  They are based on actors Bob Hope and Bing Crosby.
 Jabari (voiced by Taylor Dempsey) is the son of Baruti and Jamila, bearing an uncanny resemblance to the young Tantor. He and "Mr. Tantor" have bonded over their shared phobias and paranoia.
 Chief Keewazi (voiced by James Avery) is the Leader of the Waziri tribe, a group of natives who live deep in the jungle.
 Basuli (voiced by Phil LaMarr) is Chief Keewazi's headstrong son and future leader of the Waziri tribe. He becomes a good friend of Tarzan. Tarzan once aided Basuli in retrieving an eagle's feather, which he needed as part of a rite of passage in order to marry. Though he and Tarzan are friends, they compete in many ways.
 Dr. Robin Doyle (voiced by Sheena Easton) is a female Irish anthropologist, who began her studies in the jungle, and has the Professor smitten. The first time she came to Africa was to study the Waziri people with Professor Porter, he was afraid he was too old for her and sought out a fountain that he thought would make the drinker young again. In the episode "Protege", she brought her nephew Ian.
 Moyo (voiced by Neil Patrick Harris) is another gorilla in Tarzan's family. He once believed Tarzan cared more about Jane than the family. When Hista, an enormous red python, attacked while Tarzan was with Jane, Moyo managed to chase Hista away for the time being. When Tarzan returned, he boasted about this one-time accomplishment, claimed that Tarzan was too busy being with Jane to protect the family, and challenged Tarzan for the leadership of the gorillas. After some conflict, Moyo and Tarzan cooperated to rescue the family. Despite his arrogance and stubbornness, when the elephants and gorillas engage in jungle warfare, Moyo plays a big part in helping Tarzan lead the gorillas to victory. Just as the gorillas are about to triumph, a fire breaks out, and Moyo is the first gorilla to follow Tarzan's lead in putting out the fire.
 Hazel, (voiced by Tara Strong) Greenly, (voiced by Grey DeLisle) and Eleanor (voiced by Nicollette Sheridan) are three upper-class women and Jane's friends from England, who came to the jungle to "save" her from Tarzan. They initially thought she was unhappy (and held against her will). Hazel is said to be a gossiper in the British Isles, which is how Robert knew where to find Jane. Hazel also happens to be the name of Jane's best friend in the books, sharing her last name with the voice actor, Tara Strong.
 Mangani is a spirit ape who wanders around the jungle curing sick and wounded animals in need of healing with the help of the full moon's light which gives him his powers.

Villains
 William Cecil Clayton was mentioned and seen in one flashback Clayton was the antagonist from the film responsible for Kerchak's death until he met his own while fighting Tarzan; this caused Clayton's sister Lady Waltham to go mad for revenge for his death.
 Tublat (voiced by Keith David) is a rogue ape and a former member of Tarzan's gorilla family. He challenged Kerchak for leadership, but he was defeated and cast out, the latter for trying to win treacherously. Kala's husband (and Tarzan's foster father) is the inspiration of Tublat in the original "Tarzan" novel. His personality is much like the original Kerchak or Terkoz. Noted by the bones in the cave he formerly resided in, he may be carnivorous (unlike most gorillas). He often calls Tarzan a "hairless runt." He has four toes on his right foot (possibly lost in a fight), and this is one way to tell he is in the area.
 Queen La (voiced by Diahann Carroll) – In the original novels, she was a high priestess of a blood cult who fell in love with Tarzan. In her adaptation for the series, she is a former member of the Waziri tribe and an utterly vicious sorceress ruler over the abandoned city of Opar, where she lords over the Leopard Men. She falls in love with Tarzan after he comes to rescue Jane's father from the Leopard Men, who were capturing males as potential husbands for La. Her attempts to seduce Tarzan fail every time, as his loyalty is firm with Jane.
 Samuel T. Philander (voiced by Craig Ferguson) is Professor Archimedes' academic rival who frequently attempts to steal his ideas or garner fame by turning Tarzan in as the "missing link." On one occasion, he found Pellucidar, yet his photographic proof was ruined by Manu photographing himself. He even tried to capture the silver ape "Mangani," known for his healing powers. Samuel even tried to capture Tarzan, but his men mistook Archimedes for Tarzan (with a lot of help from Philander). His humiliations reduced him to living in a ratty apartment in Chicago and constantly ducking the Landlord when he was visited by Edgar Rice Burroughs, wanting to know what he knew about Tarzan. Philander is modeled after the British comedy actor Terry-Thomas.
 Count Nikolas Rokoff (voiced by Ron Perlman) is a greedy former Russian count stripped of his title who hears about a treasure in the valley of the leopards and plans to find it to regain his title. Tarzan refuses to help him until Rokoff threatens to kill Jane if he doesn't. His intellectual battle with Tarzan goes like a chess game until Tarzan finally releases the last few leopards from the boarded-up cave on him, but it is unclear if they kill Rokoff or not as baboons later steal the treasure.
 Lt. Colonel Staquait (voiced by Cummings) is a vicious, scar-faced Colonel in the French Foreign Legion. He sees himself on the right side of the law, but his draconian means do not justify his actions, putting him at odds with Tarzan. He acts as judge and executioner and has made it his goal to hunt down Hugo and Hooft because they refused his order to burn down a village full of women and children. Tarzan helped fake their demise, but eventually, the Colonel learned the truth and imprisoned them.
 Thaddeus Hunt (voiced by Kevin Michael Richardson) is the leader of a band of kidnappers (presumably drug traffickers) who try to kidnap Tarzan and former U.S. President Theodore Roosevelt for ransom money. His two main minions are Jake, Sam, and Jones.
 Nuru and Sheeta (voiced by Welker) are two vicious panthers that frequently find and battle Tarzan. The two are often part of a group of leopards, which is a factual error, as leopards never live in groups.
 Mabaya (voiced by Welker) is a rogue bull elephant who originally belonged to the same herd as Jabari and his parents. Mabaya, like all rogues, is almost constantly angry and attacks or tramples anything in his path. A recognizing feature is his broken right tusk and bloodshot red eyes. Episodes featuring Mabaya usually require Tantor to overcome his fears and face down the renegade in a match.
 Hista (voiced by Welker) is a giant crimson red python threatens the gorilla family until Tarzan and Moyo lured him into a tar pit, where the snake dies after sinking into it. His weakness is that he, like other snakes, has poor vision and senses body heat to hunt, a weakness Tarzan uses to his advantage (also his very name "Hista" means "snake" in Mangani).
 Johannes Niels and Merkus (voiced by John O'Hurley and Cummings) are two miners who first came to the jungle to mine diamonds. Niels is the tall, blonde-haired and calmer of the two, and Merkus is shorter, muscular and more violent. Tarzan agreed to guide them to a volcano to dig for diamonds, on the condition that he gets one to give to Jane. After a mishap, they lose their diamonds and leave in chains. They later return to retrieve the diamonds, which may not have survived the lava. They are attacked by Tublat, whom they capture, and are about to take him around the world as a showpiece until Tarzan, along with a protesting Terk, rescue him. Once again, Niels and Merkus leave the jungle empty-handed.
 Zutho (voiced by Jason Alexander) is a shady mandrill that Tarzan, Terk, and Tantor first encountered as kids at the forbidden side of the river. While Tarzan teaches Zutho and his friends Gozan and Hugo (voiced by John DiMaggio, while the latter is) how to make spears, a fire broke out and nearly destroyed the jungle, but the rain had put it down. Tarzan blamed himself and ended up in Zutho's debt. Years later, Zutho resurfaces to get Tarzan to fulfill his favor into dealing with some annoying monkeys that were keeping him up at night. With help from Jane, Terk, and Tantor, Tarzan did the right thing and admitted what happened the day of the fire to Kala, who then dealt with Zuko.
 Ian McTeague (voiced by Charles Napier) is a corrupt and greedy businessman. He started up an illegal mining operation near the mountain, where he and his men believe that there is gold for them to dig. As they do so, they use the water from the river to irrigate their operation, where they separate the dirt from ore with chemicals, which are then later spilled out into the rest of the river heading towards the jungle. Because of this, it has caused a plague among the animals drinking it (even Tantor almost fell victim to it). Even the Waziri tribe fell victim to the plague, as they used the river for their crops and drinking.
 Lady Waltham (voiced by Amanda Donohoe) is an aristocrat and sister of the deceased Clayton (originally intended to be his widow) who wants revenge on Tarzan for killing her brother (at least, in her own mind). She had her valet Hobson (voiced by Cummings) capture those close to him and then poison Tarzan. Tarzan was then given a challenge by Lady Waltham which was either save those he is close to from danger or head to a mountain she dubbed "Clayton's Peak" where the antidote is. Though Tarzan saves his friends and family, he ends up saving Lady Waltham from leopards. Afterward, she gave Tarzan the antidote realizing that Tarzan would never have killed her brother on purpose. She is implied to have made peace with Tarzan and his family and has returned to her original life.
 Muviro (voiced by Richardson) is a treacherous Waziri warrior and one of Basuli's subordinates. Despite serving for Basuli, Muviro holds a personal hatred and jealousy against the chief's son and is hostile towards outsiders (mainly Tarzan and his friends). Upon learning that Basuli is planning to get an eagle's feather with Tarzan's help as part of the customs for Basuli to marry and be a future chief, Muviro secretly plotted to dispose of Basuli so that he can be the new chief. 
 Robert Canler (voiced by Bennett) is Jane's old childhood friend and next-door neighbor, nicknamed Bobby, who known her since she was five. He is an ace pilot who carries a sword-cane with a silver eagle head and a Webley pistol and flies in a plane with floats. He once worked for British Intelligence but switched to the "other side" (possibly Germany, but never specified) as a double agent when he realized how profitable it would be by bringing them a code machine (disguised as a music box) that he gave Jane. Despite his betrayal of Jane, he rescues her from certain death before being arrested by Captain Nigel Taylor of the RAF.
 Sabor the Leopard (mentioned; responsible for the deaths of Tarzan's original human parents as well as Kala's child in the first film; killed in battle against Tarzan).

Supporting
 Dania (voiced by Kathy Najimy) is a beautiful female elephant who wants to be with Tantor for her love. Terk gets the two elephants together, and they hit it off. Dania meets Tantor's friends except for Tarzan, whose tracking poachers. Dania strongly dislikes Terk, regarding her as obnoxious and loud.
 Bob Markham (voiced by Mark Harmon) is a logger, widower, and single father to his daughter Abby. However, the way he was logging tore up so much soil that a long-dormant plague was released and threatened to kill his men and daughter. 
 Abigail "Abby" Markham (voiced by Nicolette Little) is the daughter of Bob Markham. She appears to be around 5–9 years old. Markham loves his daughter and will do anything for her. When she falls ill with the same plague that threatens his men, he asks for Tarzan's help to cure her.
 Gobu (voiced by Tate Donovan) is a gorilla from another family. Tarzan and Terk saved him from being attacked by hyenas, only ending with a broken leg. Terk felt she wasn't girly enough for him. He managed to trick Tarzan into coming with him to his family so he could meet his leader. Tarzan then finds out Tublat is his leader. He showed up a few months ago and killed Gobu's original leader. Tublat and Tarzan prepare for battle, but Gobu stands up to him and reminds everyone that there is strength in numbers, and the gorillas gang up on Tublat, driving him off. Gobu then steps in to take place as a new leader. Terk tries her lady charms, but Gubo tells her that he always liked Terk the way she is. They both end up leaving to throw mud at warthogs.
 Edgar Rice Burroughs (voiced by Steven Weber) is a fictionalized version of Tarzan's creator, he is an American book author who needed inspiration for his next novel. He eventually finds it when discovering about Tarzan. After meeting some of Tarzan's acquaintances, he finally meets Tarzan when Tarzan saves him. After speaking with Tarzan and Jane, he creates a novel (in comparison to the real-life official version), and his boss says everyone will remember him by it.
 Theodore Roosevelt (voiced by Stephen Root) is the Former President of the United States. Roosevelt appeared in the show based on the Smithsonian–Roosevelt African Expedition, a real-life trip Roosevelt took to Africa after his presidency to collect wildlife for the American Museum of Natural History of New York City.

Episodes

Series overview

Season 1 (2001/2002–2003)

Season 2 (2003)
Note: All episodes of Season 2 were used in the plot of the direct to video sequel to the first film, Tarzan & Jane which came out on July 23, 2002, though some parts have been cut to make them look more like flashbacks. These episodes are believed to have happened sometime during or before Season 1, since some characters first appearances occurred in these episodes, the overall true specific order is unknown.

Broadcast
In late 2001, Disney Channel added The Legend of Tarzan to their lineup. Reruns continued until September 2, 2003, when the series (along with Fillmore! and Buzz Lightyear of Star Command) was pre-empted in favor of a 90-minute showing of Recess. Reruns aired on Toon Disney until 2009 (and at some point, aired on the Jetix block) and when it converted to Disney XD, it ran from 2009 to 2012. As of 2023, it is not available on Disney+, with the exception of Tarzan & Jane.

Critical Reception
CommonSenseMedia gave the show a rating of 3 stars out of 5, writing "Despite the show's charms, it doesn't quite live up to the original film. But it does teach viewers about the responsibilities of growing up — the good, the bad, and, of course, the funny — and it's definitely something that families can watch together, especially as it spends a lot of time focusing on family dynamics." The Hour praised the show for having Disney-quality animation, for being faithful to the film's storyline, and for giving viewers a chance to discover what happens after the movie ends. However, it noted the voice actors are not the same and said the voice of Terk is "really annoying".

In 2002, the show was nominated for a Daytime Emmy Award and two Golden Reel Awards.

References

External links
 
 

Tarzan (franchise)
2000s American animated television series
2001 American television series debuts
2003 American television series endings
American children's animated action television series
American children's animated adventure television series
American children's animated comedy television series
American children's animated fantasy television series
American sequel television series
American television shows based on children's books
Animated Tarzan television series
Animated television series about apes
Animated television series about elephants
Animated television series about orphans
Animated television shows based on films
Cultural depictions of Edgar Rice Burroughs
Disney Channel original programming
Disney's One Too
English-language television shows
Television series based on Disney films
Television series based on adaptations
Television series by Disney Television Animation
Television shows set in Africa
UPN original programming